Route 117 or Highway 117 can refer to multiple roads:

Argentina
 National Route 117

Australia 
 - Separation Street

Canada
 New Brunswick Route 117
Ontario Highway 117 (former)
 Prince Edward Island Route 117
 Quebec Route 117

Costa Rica
 National Route 117

India
 National Highway 117 (India)

Japan
 Route 117 (Japan)

United States
 U.S. Route 117
 U.S. Route 117 (former)
 Alabama State Route 117
 Arkansas Highway 117
 California State Route 117 (former)
 Connecticut Route 117
 Florida State Road 117
 County Road 117 (Duval County, Florida)
 Georgia State Route 117
 Illinois Route 117
 Indiana State Road 117
 Iowa Highway 117
 K-117 (Kansas highway)
 Kentucky Route 117
 Louisiana Highway 117
 Maine State Route 117
 Maryland Route 117
Maryland Route 117A
 Massachusetts Route 117
 M-117 (Michigan highway)
 Minnesota State Highway 117
 Missouri Route 117
 Montana Highway 117
 Nevada State Route 117
 New Hampshire Route 117
 County Route 117 (Bergen County, New Jersey)
 New Mexico State Road 117
 New York State Route 117
 County Route 117 (Broome County, New York)
 County Route 117 (Niagara County, New York)
 County Route 117 (Onondaga County, New York)
 County Route 117 (Rensselaer County, New York)
 County Route 117 (Steuben County, New York)
 County Route 117 (Suffolk County, New York)
 County Route 117 (Sullivan County, New York)
 County Route 117 (Tompkins County, New York)
 North Carolina Highway 117 (former)
 Ohio State Route 117
 Oklahoma State Highway 117
 Pennsylvania Route 117
 Rhode Island Route 117
 Rhode Island Route 117A
 Tennessee State Route 117
 Texas State Highway 117 (former)
 Texas State Highway Spur 117
 Farm to Market Road 117
 Utah State Route 117
 Vermont Route 117
 Virginia State Route 117
 Virginia State Route 117 (1923-1926) (former)
 Virginia State Route 117 (1926-1928) (former)
 Virginia State Route 117 (1928-1933) (former)
 Washington State Route 117
 Wisconsin Highway 117

Territories
 Puerto Rico Highway 117

See also
A117 road
D117 road
R117 road (Ireland)
S117 (Amsterdam)